The Association of Inland Navigation Authorities (AINA) is an unincorporated  membership organisation in the United Kingdom. Membership is available for navigation authorities in the United Kingdom who have legal responsibility for managing an inland waterway which is open and operational.

List of member organisations
This list is not exhaustive.

Avon Navigation Trust.
Basingstoke Canal Authority.
Bridgewater Canal Company.
Essex Waterways Limited
Middle Level Commissioners.

References
https://aina.org.uk/members/

External links
 AINA's official website

Water transport in the United Kingdom
Inland waterway authorities
Transport organisations based in the United Kingdom